The Original Recordings may refer to:

Original Recordings (Elkie Brooks album)
The Original Recordings compilation album by The Detroit Cobras 2008
FZ Original Recordings; Steve Vai Archives, Vol. 2 Frank Zappa
Enrico Caruso original recordings discography